Kulwinder Singh Gill, (Jan 14, 1960) better known as Guggu Gill, is an Indian film actor who mainly works in Punjabi cinema. He was one of the leading actors in Punjabi cinema in the 1990s along with Yograj Singh. He has done 65-70 films so far.

Career
Gill debuted with a minor role in super-hit Putt Jattan De (1983) in a dog fight scene. He has starred in films including Jatt Jeona Morh, Truck Driver, Badla Jatti Da and Jatt Te Zameen. He is known for the villainous role he played in Gabhroo Punjab Da. His career as leading hero has paired him with top female artists from Punjabi cinema like Daljeet Kaur, Upasana Singh, Priti Sapru, Manjeet Kullar and Ravinder Maan. Gill has done 7-8 films with director Ravinder Ravi, including hits like Anakh Jattan Di, Jatt Jeona Morh and Pratigya. For his outstanding contribution to Punjabi cinema, the actor was conferred with the Lifetime Achievement Award at the PTC Punjabi film awards in 2013.

Personal life

Gill is a resident of Mahni Khera village near Malout city in Muktsar District of Punjab (India).

Filmography

 Putt Jattan De (1983) .... Dog fight scene (friendly appearance)
 Chhora Haryane Ka (1985) ... Jagroop 'Jaggu' (Haryanvi movie)
 Gabhroo Punjab Da (1986) .... Jagroop 'Jaggu'
 Jatt Te Zameen (1989) .... Jagga
 Qurbani Jatt Di (1990) .... NaahraAnakh Jattan Di (1990) .... JaggaJatt Jeona Mour (1991) .... Jeona Morh Yaaran Naal Baharan (1991) .... Jageer Singh/Gurmeet (dual role)Jorr Jatt Da (1991) .... JaggaBadla Jatti Da (1991) - JaggaDil Da Mamla (1992) .... JeetPutt Sardaran De (1992) .... DullaLalkara Jatti Da (1993) .... JaggaBaaghi Soormey (1993) .... JaggaMirza Jatt (1993) .... MirzaVairi (1994) .... Bans Singh 'Bansaa'Mera Punjab (1994) .... SSP Shamsher SinghPratigya (1995) .... NooraZaildaar (1995) .... Zaildaar JoraSmuggler (1996) .... Deva (Hindi movie)Sardari (1997) .... Harjinder Singh ‘Jinda’Jung Da Maidan (1997) .... Jaswant 'Jassa'Truck Driver (1997) .... JaggaPurja-Purja Katt Mare (1998) .... Shivdev Singh ‘Shabba’Muqadder (1999) .... Sardar Ajit SinghSikandera (2001) .... SikanderaBadla: The Revenge (2003) .... Shamsher SinghNalayak (2005) .... TigerRustam-e-Hind (2006) .... Jagtar SinghMehndi Wale Hath (2006) .... Ranjeet SinghVidroh (2007) .... JaggaMajaajan (2007) .... Faqeer BabaKaun Kise Da Beli (2008) .... Guest AppearanceMera Pind (2008) .... Mr. Bhullar- Himmat's brotherLuv U Bobby (2009) .... Colonel SandhuAkhiyaan Udeekdian (2009) .... DilsherHeer Ranjha: A True Love Story (2009) .... Saida KherhaSiyasat (2009) .... Prof. Jarnail SinghJawani Zindabad (2010) .... Joginder SinghIk Kudi Punjab Di (2010) .... Professor GillKabaddi Ikk Mohabbat (2010) .... Gurnam RandhawaSimran (2010) .... Jarnail SinghRehmataan (2012) .... Kulwinder Singh (TV Movie)Ajj De Ranjhe (2012) .... SSP- Punjab PoliceStupid 7 (2013) .... Jass- Parry's fatherJatt Boys Putt Jattan De (2013) .... Shinda Singh BrarRonde Sare Vyah Picho (2013) .... Mr. Brar Aa Gaye Munde U.K. De (2014)
 Dilli 1984 (2014)
 Gun & Goal (2015) .... Jagbeer Singh Gill 
 The Mastermind: Jinda Sukha (2015) 
 Dildariyaan (2015) .... Ajmer Sidhu
 Shareek (2015) .... Surjeet 
 25 kille (2016) .... Saudagar Singh 
 Kinna Karde Ha Pyar (2016) .... Professor Daura (TV Movie)
 Sardar Saab (2017) .... Nishchay Singh 
 Lahoriye (2017) .... Jorawar Singh
 Subedar Joginder Singh (2018) .... Maan Singh 
 Khido Khundi (2018) .... Balveer Singh
 Qismat (2018) .... SHO Gurnam Singh
 Jindari (2018) .... SSP Brar (TV Movie)
 Bhajjo Veero Ve (2018) .... Bakhtaawar
 Dulla Vaily (2019) .... Daleep Singh 'Dulla' 
 Lukan Michi (2019) .... Daler Singh Sarpanch
 Jaddi Sardar (2019) .... Jagtar Singh 'Jagga'
 Aasra (2019) .... Daara
 Jora -The Second Chapter (2020) .... Chaudhary Dharamveer Chautala
 Shikaari (2021) ….. Jeeta (Web Series)
 Bajre Da Sitta (2022)
 Oye Makhna (2022)
 Teri Meri Gal Ban Gayi (2022) ... (filming)
 Nishana'' (2022) ... (filming)

References

External links

Male actors in Punjabi cinema
21st-century Indian male actors
20th-century Indian male actors
Indian Sikhs
Male actors from Punjab, India
Punjabi people
Indian male voice actors
Living people
1960 births